Halla is a feminine given name and a surname. People with the name include:

Given name

First name
Halla Margrét Árnadóttir (born 1964), Icelandic singer
Halla Bouksani (born 2000), Algerian badminton player
Halla Diyab, Libyan-born British screenwriter
Halla Gunnarsdóttir (born 1981), Icelandic politician and journalist 
Halla Pai Huhm (1922–1994), Korean American dancer
Halla Mohieddeen (born 1979), Lebanese British journalist and television presenter
Halla Tómasdóttir (born 1968), Icelandic business person and public speaker
Halla Vilhjálmsdóttir (born 1982), Icelandic actress, and singer

Middle name
Arndís Halla Ásgeirsdóttir (born 1969), Icelandic opera singer 
Freydís Halla Einarsdóttir (born 1994), Icelandic ski racer

Surname
John Halla (1884–1947), American baseball player
Joseph Halla (1814–1887), Czech Austrian physician
Martin Halla (born 1988), Norwegian singer 
Paul Halla (1931–2005), Austrian football player

Arabic feminine given names
Icelandic feminine given names
Surnames from given names